The 1984 NCAA Division III Men's Ice Hockey Tournament was the culmination of the 1983–84 season, the 1st such tournament in NCAA history. It concluded with Babson defeating Union 8-0. All Quarterfinals matchups were held at home team venues, while all succeeding games were played in Rochester, New York.

Qualifying teams
Because neither of the two western conferences held a conference tournament the NCAA had all western schools play collectively in the Western Intercollegiate Hockey Association. At the conclusion of the regular season the top 8 teams, regardless of their conference, were invited to play in the WIHA tournament. Though the tournament was arranged by the NCAA it is not considered as part of the NCAA tournament and is displayed here for reference. This tournament had been used to determine the Division II tournament invitees but, with the majority of bids being submitted to the Division III tournament, the regional tournament was now used for this championship.

WIHA Tournament

NCAA Qualifiers
The following teams qualified for the tournament. There were no automatic bids, however, conference tournament champions were given preferential consideration. No formal seeding was used while quarterfinal matches were arranged so that the road teams would have the shortest possible travel distances.

Format
The tournament featured three rounds of play. In the Quarterfinals, teams played two-game aggregate series to determine which school advanced to the semifinals. Beginning with the semifinals all games became Single-game eliminations. The winning teams in the semifinals advanced to the National Championship Game with the losers playing in a Third Place game. The teams were seeded according to geographic proximity in the quarterfinals so the visiting team would have the shortest feasible distance to travel.

Tournament bracket

Note: * denotes overtime period(s)

All-Tournament team
G: Keith Houghton (Babson)
D: Joe Thibert (Babson)
D: John MacKenzie (Union)
F: Richie Herbert (RIT)
F: Gill Egan (Union)
F: Russ McKinnon (Babson)
F: Paul Donato* (Babson)
* Most Outstanding Player(s)

Record by conference

References

External links
Division III Men's Ice Hockey Record Book

 
NCAA Division III ice hockey